Calvus (Latin for "bald") may refer to:

People
Gaius Licinius Macer Calvus (82 BC–c. 47 BC), orator and poet of ancient Rome
Gnaeus Cornelius Scipio Calvus (died 211 BC), Roman general and statesman
Constantine III of Scotland (before 971–997), King of Scots, known in Latin as Constantinus Calvus
Baldwin II, Margrave of Flanders (c. 865–918), nicknamed "Calvus"
Owain Foel (fl. 1018), King of the Cumbrians, also known as Eugenius Calvus

See also
Altolamprologus calvus, a species of Cichlidae fish from Lake Tanganyika, Africa
Cumulonimbus calvus, a type of cloud